"I Want a Hippopotamus for Christmas" is a Christmas novelty song written by John Rox (1902–1957) and performed by Gayla Peevey (10 years old at the time) in 1953. The song peaked at number 24 on Billboard magazine's pop chart in December 1953.

History
Peevey was a child star who was born in Oklahoma City, Oklahoma. Her family moved to Ponca City, Oklahoma, when she was five. When released nationally by Columbia Records the song shot to the top of the charts, and the Oklahoma City Zoo acquired a baby hippo named Matilda.

In October 1953, Peevey performed the song on The Ed Sullivan Show in an episode that would air on November 15, 1953. A video of this performance is available on her website.

A popular legend holds that this 1953 hit had been recorded as a fundraiser to bring the city zoo a hippo, but in a 2007 radio interview with Detroit-based WNIC radio station, Peevey clarified that the song was not originally recorded as a fundraiser. Instead, the Oklahoma City Zoo and a local newspaper, picking up on the popularity of the song and Peevey's local roots, launched the Gayla Peevey hippo fund so Peevey could be presented with an actual hippopotamus on Christmas.

The campaign succeeded, and she was presented with an actual hippopotamus, which – as had been planned all along – she donated to the city zoo. The hippopotamus lived for nearly 50 years. In 2017, Peevey, then 73 years old, was again present when the Oklahoma City Zoo acquired a rare pygmy hippopotamus from the San Diego Zoo.

In a 2010 interview, Peevey said that she had never received any royalties from the song.

B-side
The B-side of the original 78 featured the song "Are my Ears on Straight?"

Other releases
It is a Dr. Demento Christmas staple, having been released on his album The Greatest Novelty Records of All Time Vol. 6: Christmas.

A version by Vicki Dale and the Peter Pan Orchestra was released in 1953.

The Three Stooges also recorded a version in 1959.

Bob Keeshan, as Captain Kangaroo, recorded a version of the song in 1961 with his collaborator Lumpy Brannum as Mr. Green Jeans.

Malcolm T Elliot recorded and released a version in 1975. The song peaked at number 83 in Australia.

Country music singer Gretchen Wilson recorded a rendition in late 2009. It debuted at No. 54 on the Billboard Hot Country Songs charts dated for January 2, 2010. It is included on her album Christmas in My Heart, released in 2013.

American recording artist LeAnn Rimes released her cover of the song as a digital single for her EP, One Christmas: Chapter 1 (2014).

American recording artist Kacey Musgraves recorded and released a version in 2016 for her Christmas album entitled A Very Kacey Christmas.

References

1953 songs
2009 singles
Christmas novelty songs
American Christmas songs
Columbia Records singles
Songs about Santa Claus